Day Three of My New Life is the second full length album by the rock band Knapsack. It was released on February 25, 1997, on Alias Records, and re-released in 2014 on Poison City Records.

Critical reception
The A.V. Club called the album "the band’s crowning achievement." CMJ New Music Report called it "a noisy, post-punk bonfire." Vulture wrote that "[Knapsack's] songs were always a little too curiously shaped to break into the mainstream, but you can still hear the crossover potential in the sensitivity of their dynamics."

Track listing
"Thursday Side Of The Street" - 2:48
"Courage Was Confused" - 3:51
"Decorate The Spine" - 2:39
"Diamond Mine" - 4:21
"Simple Favor" - 3:02
"Boxing Gloves" - 3:36
"Henry Hammers Harder" - 3:50
"Perfect" - 3:51
"Heart Carved Tree" - 4:15
"Steeper Than We Thought" - 3:05

Personnel 
Cole Gerst – design
Knapsack – producer
Colby Mancasola – drums
Stephen Marcussen – mastering
Rod Meyer – bass guitar
Blair Shehan – guitar, vocals
Mark Trombino – producer, engineer, mixing
Allen Yost – illustrations

References

Knapsack (band) albums
1997 albums